Kim Young-sung(Korean:김영성, born 1 May 1983) is a South Korean ice sledge hockey player. He played in the 2014 Paralympic Winter Games. He also won a silver medal at the 2012 IPC Ice Sledge Hockey World Championships. Kim was a member of South Korea's bronze medal winning team in para ice hockey at the 2018 Winter Paralympics.

References

External links 
 

1983 births
Living people
South Korean sledge hockey players
Paralympic sledge hockey players of South Korea
Paralympic bronze medalists for South Korea
Para ice hockey players at the 2018 Winter Paralympics
Para ice hockey players at the 2022 Winter Paralympics
Medalists at the 2018 Winter Paralympics
Paralympic medalists in sledge hockey